The carob (Ceratonia siliqua) is a flowering evergreen tree or shrub in the Caesalpinioideae sub-family of the legume family, Fabaceae. It is widely cultivated for its edible fruit pods, and as an ornamental tree in gardens and landscapes. The carob tree is native to the Mediterranean region and the Middle East. Portugal is the largest producer of carob, followed by Italy and Morocco.

In the Mediterranean Basin, extended to the southern Atlantic coast of Portugal (i.e. the Algarve region) and the Atlantic northwestern Moroccan coast, carob pods were often used as animal feed and in times of famine, as "the last source of [human] food in hard times". The ripe, dried, and sometimes toasted pod is often ground into carob powder, which was sometimes used as an ersatz cocoa powder, especially in the 1970s natural food movement. The powder and chips can be used as a chocolate alternative in most recipes.

Description

The crown is broad and semispherical, supported by a thick trunk with rough brown bark and sturdy branches.

Most carob trees are dioecious and some are hermaphroditic, so strictly male trees do not produce fruit. When the trees blossom in autumn, the flowers are small and numerous, spirally arranged along the inflorescence axis in catkin-like racemes borne on spurs from old wood and even on the trunk (cauliflory); they are pollinated by both wind and insects. The male flowers smell like human semen, an odor that is caused in part by amines.

The fruit is a legume (also known commonly, but less accurately, as a pod), that is elongated, compressed, straight, or curved, and thickened at the sutures. The pods take a full year to develop and ripen. When the sweet, ripe pods eventually fall to the ground, they are eaten by various mammals, such as swine, thereby dispersing the hard inner seed in the excrement.

The seeds of the carob tree contain leucodelphinidin, a colourless flavanol precursor related to leucoanthocyanidins.

Etymology

The word "carob" comes from Middle French  (modern French ), which borrowed it from Arabic  (kharrūb, "locust bean pod"), which ultimately borrowed it perhaps from Akkadian language  or Aramaic kharubha, or related to Hebrew kharuv. Ceratonia siliqua, the scientific name of the carob tree, derives from the Greek kerátiοn κεράτιον "fruit of the carob" (from keras κέρας "horn"), and Latin siliqua "pod, carob".

In English, it is also known as "St. John's bread" and "locust tree" (not to be confused with African locust bean). The latter designation also applies to several other trees from the same family.

In Yiddish, it is called bokser, derived from the medieval German bockshornbaum (ram's horn tree, in reference to the shape of the carob).

The carat, a unit of mass for gemstones, and a measurement of purity for gold, takes its name from the Greek word for a carob seed, keration, via the Arabic word, qīrāṭ.

Distribution and habitat 
Although cultivated extensively, carob can still be found growing wild in eastern Mediterranean regions, and has become naturalized in the west.

The tree is typical in the southern Portuguese region of the Algarve, where the tree is called alfarrobeira, and the fruit alfarroba. It is also seen in southern and eastern Spain, mainly in the regions of Andalusia, Murcia and Valencia; Malta, on the Italian islands of Sicily and Sardinia, in Southern Croatia, in eastern Bulgaria, and in Southern Greece, Cyprus, as well as on many Greek islands such as Crete and Samos. In Israel, the Hebrew name is חרוב (translit. charuv). , meaning "wooden horn"). In Turkey, it is known as "goat's horn".

The various trees known as algarrobo in Latin America (Albizia saman in Cuba, Prosopis pallida in Peru, and four species of Prosopis in Argentina and Paraguay) belong to a different subfamily of the Fabaceae: Mimosoideae. Early Spanish settlers named them algarrobo after the carob tree  because they also produce pods with sweet pulp.

Ecology 

The carob genus, Ceratonia, belongs to the legume family, Fabaceae, and is believed to be an archaic remnant of a part of this family now generally considered extinct. It grows well in warm temperate and subtropical areas, and tolerates hot and humid coastal areas. As a xerophyte (drought-resistant species), carob is well adapted to the conditions of the Mediterranean region with just  of rainfall per year.

Carob trees can survive long periods of drought, but to grow fruit, they need  of rainfall per year.  They prefer well-drained, sandy loams and are intolerant of waterlogging, but the deep root systems can adapt to a wide variety of soil conditions and are fairly salt-tolerant (up to 3% in soil). After being irrigated with saline water in the summer, carob trees could possibly recover during winter rainfalls. In some experiments, young carob trees were capable of basic physiological functions under high salt conditions (40 mmol NaCl/L).

Not all legume species can develop a symbiotic relationship with rhizobia to make use of atmospheric nitrogen. It remains unclear if carob trees have this ability: Some findings suggest that it is not able to form root nodules with rhizobia, while in another more recent study, trees have been identified with nodules containing bacteria believed to be from the genus Rhizobium. However, a study measuring the 15N-signal (isotopic signature) in the tissue of the carob tree did not support the theory that carob trees naturally use atmospheric nitrogen.

Cultivation 
The vegetative propagation of carob is naturally restricted due to its low adventitious rooting potential. Therefore, grafting and air-layering may prove to be more effective methods of asexual propagation. Seeds are commonly used as the propagation medium. The sowing occurs in pot nurseries in early spring and the cooling- and drying-sensitive seedlings are then transplanted to the field in the next year after the last frost. Carob trees enter slowly into production phase. Where in areas with favorable growing conditions, the cropping starts 3–4 years after budding, with the nonbearing period requiring up to 8 years in regions with marginal soils. Full bearing of the trees occurs mostly at a tree-age of 20–25 years when the yield stabilizes. The orchards are traditionally planted in low densities of 25–45 trees per hectare. Hermaphrodite plants or male trees, which produce fewer or no pods, respectively, are usually planted in lower densities in the orchards as pollenizers.

Intercropping with other tree species is widely spread. Not much cultivation management is required. Only light pruning and occasional tilling to reduce weeds is necessary. Nitrogen-fertilizing of the plants has been shown to have positive impacts on yield performance. Although it is native to moderately dry climates, two or three summers irrigation greatly aid the development, hasten the fruiting, and increase the yield of a carob tree.

Harvest and post-harvest treatment
The most labour-intensive part of carob cultivation is harvesting, which is often done by knocking the fruit down with a long stick and gathering them together with the help of laid-out nets. This is a delicate task because the trees are flowering at the same time and care has to be taken not to damage the flowers and the next year's crop.  The literature recommends research to get the fruit to ripen more uniformly or also for cultivars which can be mechanically harvested (by shaking).

After harvest, carob pods have a moisture content of 10–20% and should be dried down to a moisture content of 8% so the pods do not rot. Further processing separates the kernels (seeds) from the pulp. This process is called kibbling and results in seeds and pieces of carob pods (kibbles). Processing of the pulp includes grinding for animal feed production or roasting and milling for human food industry. The seeds have to be peeled which happens with acid or through roasting. Then the endosperm and the embryo are separated for different uses.

Pests and diseases
Few pests are known to cause severe damage in carob orchards, so they have traditionally not been treated with pesticides. Some generalist pests such as the larvae of the leopard moth (Zeuzera pyrina L.), the dried fruit moth (Cadra calidella), small rodents such as rats  (Rattus spp.) and gophers (Pitymys spp.) can cause damage occasionally in some regions. Only some cultivars are severely susceptible to mildew disease (Oidium ceratoniae C.). One pest directly associated with carob is the larva of the carob moth (Myelois ceratoniae Z.), which can cause extensive postharvest damage.

Cadra calidella attack carob crops before harvest and infest products in stores. This moth, prevalent in Cyprus, will often infest the country's carob stores. Research has been conducted to understand the physiology of the moth, in order to gain insight on how to monitor moth reproduction and lower their survival rates, such as through temperature control, pheromone traps, or parasitoid traps.

Cultivars and breeding aims
Most of the roughly 50 known cultivars are of unknown origin and only regionally distributed. The cultivars show high genetic and therefore morphological and agronomical variation. No conventional breeding by controlled crossing has been reported, but selection from orchards or wild populations has been done. Domesticated carobs (C. s. var. edulis) can be distinguished from their wild relatives (C. s. var. silvestris) by some fruit-yielding traits such as building of greater beans, more pulp, and higher sugar contents. Also, genetic adaptation of some varieties to the climatic requirements of their growing regions has occurred. Though a partially successful breaking of the dioecy happened, the yield of hermaphroditic trees still cannot compete with that of female plants, as their pod-bearing properties are worse. Future breeding would be focused on processing-quality aspects, as well as on properties for better mechanization of harvest or better-yielding hermaphroditic plants. The use of modern breeding techniques is restricted due to low polymorphism for molecular markers.

In 2017, world production of carob was 136,540 tonnes, led by Spain 40%, Portugal follows, with 30% of the world total. Italy, Morocco, Turkey, Greece,  and Cyprus was the next major producer (see table).

Uses

Food

Carob products consumed by humans come from the dried, sometimes roasted, pod, which has two main parts: the pulp accounts for 90% and the seeds 10% by weight. Carob pulp is sold either as flour or "chunks". The flour of the carob embryo (seed) can also be used for human and animal nutrition, but the seed is often separated before making carob powder (see section on locust bean gum below).

Carob pods are mildly sweet on their own (being roughly 1/3 to 1/2 sugar by dry weight), so they are used in powdered, chip or syrup form as an ingredient in cakes and cookies, sometimes as a substitute for chocolate in recipes because of the color, texture, and taste of carob. In Malta, a traditional sweet called karamelli tal-harrub and eaten during the Christian holidays of Lent and Good Friday is made from carob pods. Dried carob fruit is traditionally eaten on the Jewish holiday of Tu Bishvat.

Carob powder 
Carob powder (Carob Pulp Flour
) is made of roasted, then finely ground, carob pod pulp.

Locust bean gum 
The production of locust bean gum (LBG), a thickening agent used in the food industry, is the most important economic use of carob seeds (and now of the carob tree as a whole). Locust bean gum is used as a thickening agent and stabilizer to replace fat in low-calorie products, or as a substitute for gluten.

Locust bean gum is produced from the endosperm, which accounts for 42–46% of the carob seed, and is rich in galactomannans (88% of endosperm dry mass). Galactomannans are hydrophilic and swell in water. If galactomannans are mixed with other gelling substances, such as carrageenan, they can be used to effectively thicken the liquid part of food. This is used extensively in canned food for animals in order to get the "jellied" texture.

Animal feed 
While chocolate contains the chemical compound theobromine in levels that are toxic to some mammals, carob contains none, and it also has no caffeine, so it is sometimes used to make chocolate-like treats for dogs.  Carob pod meal is also used as an energy-rich feed for livestock, particularly for ruminants, though its high tannin content may limit this use.

Historically, carob pods were mainly used for animal fodder in the Maltese Islands, apart from times of famine or war, when they formed part of the diet of many Maltese people. On the Iberian Peninsula, carob pods were historically fed to donkeys.

Composition 

The pulp of a carob pod is about 48–56% sugars and 18% cellulose and hemicellulose. Some differences in sugar (sucrose) content are seen between wild and cultivated carob trees: ~531 g/kg dry weight in cultivated varieties and ~437 g/kg in wild varieties. Fructose and glucose levels do not differ between cultivated and wild carob. The embryo (20-25% of seed weight) is rich in proteins (50%). The testa, or seed coat (30–33% of seed weight), contains cellulose, lignins, and tannins.

Syrup and drinks
Carob pods are about 1/3 to 1/2 sugar by weight, and this sugar can be extracted into a syrup. In Malta, a carob syrup (ġulepp tal-ħarrub) is made out of the pods. Carob syrup is also used in Crete, and Cyprus exports it.

Sharab al-kharroub is carob juice. Debs Kharroub is carob molasses.
 
In Palestine, crushed pods are heated to caramelize its sugar, then water added and boiled for some time. The result is a cold beverage, also called kharrub, which is sold by juice shops and street vendors, especially in summer.

In Lebanon the browned pods are boiled until a black liquid is produced. The pods are then removed and the liquid is reduced until a thick, black molasse is obtained. The molasse is called debs el kharrub (literally: molasse of the carob), but people generally shorten it to debs. The molasse has a sweet, chocolate-like flavor. It is commonly mixed with tahini (typically 75% kharrub molasses and 25% tahini). The resulting mixture is called debs bi tahini and is eaten raw or with bread. The molasse is also used in certain cakes. The region of Iqlim al-Kharrub, which translates to the region of the carob, produces a significant amount of carob.

Carob is used for compote, liqueur, and syrup in Turkey, Malta, Portugal, Spain, and Sicily. In Libya, carob syrup (called rub) is used as a complement to asida (made from wheat flour). The so-called "carob syrup" made in Peru is actually from the fruit of the Prosopis nigra tree. Because of its strong taste, carob syrup is sometimes flavored with orange or chocolate. In Yemen, carob tree is playing a role in controlling diabetes mellitus according to Yemeni folk medicine, and diabetics consume carob pods as a juice to lower their blood sugar levels.

Ornamental

The carob tree is widely cultivated in the horticultural nursery industry as an ornamental plant for Mediterranean climates and other temperate regions around the world, being especially popular in California and Hawaii. The plant develops a sculpted trunk and the form of an ornamental tree after being "limbed up" as it matures, otherwise it is used as a dense and large screening hedge. The plant is very drought tolerant as long as one does not care about the size of the fruit harvest, so can be used in xeriscape landscape design for gardens, parks, and public municipal and commercial landscapes.

Timber

In some areas of Greece, viz. Crete, carob wood is often used as a firewood. As it makes such excellent fuel, it is sometimes even preferred over oak or olive wood. 

Because the much fluted stem usually shows heart rot, carob wood is rarely used for construction timber. However, it is sometimes sought for ornamental work--particularly for furniture design, as the natural shape of the trunk is well-suited to the task. Additionally, the extremely wavy grain of the wood gives carob wood exceptional resistance to splitting; thus, sections of Carob bole are suitable for chopping blocks for splitting wood.

Gallery

See also 
Ratti, a seed from which the Indian measure unit "tola" derived

Notes

References

External links 

 Carob in Fruits of Warm Climates: Julia F. Morton, 1987
 U.C.CalPhotos: Carob —Ceratonia siliqua — Photo Gallery

Caesalpinioideae
Edible legumes
Fruit trees
Flora of Western Asia
Flora of Albania
Flora of Algeria
Flora of the Balearic Islands
Flora of Bosnia and Herzegovina
Flora of Bulgaria
Flora of Corsica
Flora of Crete
Flora of Cyprus
Flora of Greece
Flora of Iran
Flora of Iraq
Flora of Italy
Flora of Kosovo
Flora of Lebanon and Syria
Flora of Libya
Flora of North Macedonia
Flora of Montenegro
Flora of Morocco
Flora of Palestine (region)
Flora of Portugal
Flora of Sardinia
Flora of Serbia
Flora of Sicily
Flora of Spain
Flora of the Canary Islands
Flora of Tunisia
Trees of Mediterranean climate
Trees of Europe
Drought-tolerant trees
Ornamental trees
Garden plants of Africa
Garden plants of Asia
Garden plants of Europe
Flora of France
Plants described in 1753
Dioecious plants
Ceratonia
Flora of the Mediterranean Basin